Henry Capell (born before 1537 – 1588), of Hadham Hall in the parish of Little Hadham in Hertfordshire and of Rayne in Essex, was an English politician.

Origins
He was the eldest son of Sir Edward Capell (d.1577) of Aspenden Hall, Hertfordshire, by his wife Anne Pelham, a daughter of Sir William Pelham of Loughton in Essex. He was a descendant of Sir William Capel (c.1446-1515) of Capel Court in the parish of 
St Bartholomew-by-the-Exchange in the City of London and of Hadham Hall, Lord Mayor of London.

Career
He was a Justice of the Peace for Essex from 1575 and for Hertfordshire from 1577. He was appointed Sheriff of Essex for 1579–80 and Sheriff of Hertfordshire for 1585–86. He was a Member of Parliament for Hertfordshire in 1563. He died in 1588.

Marriages & issue
He married twice:
Firstly to Katherine Manners, a daughter of Thomas Manners, 1st Earl of Rutland, by whom he had 7 sons and 4 daughters, including:
Sir Gamaliel Capell (1561-1613), 4th son, of Rookwood Hall in the parish of Abbess Roding in Essex, a Member of Parliament for the county seat of Essex.
Secondly he married Mary Browne, a daughter of Sir Anthony Browne (d.1548), MP, of Battle Abbey and Cowdray Park in Sussex, and widow of Lord John Grey of Pirgo in Essex.

References

1588 deaths
Members of the Parliament of England for Hertfordshire
People from East Hertfordshire District
People from Braintree District
English MPs 1563–1567
High Sheriffs of Hertfordshire
High Sheriffs of Essex
Year of birth uncertain